William Arnold "Billy" Higgs (1880–1958) was a British Thoroughbred horse racing jockey, trainer, owner and breeder, colloquially referred to as "Farmer Higgs". He was twice Champion Jockey of Britain.

Career 
For the most successful period of his career, he was stable jockey to Sam Darling at Beckhampton, Wiltshire.  With Darling, he won the 1906 and 1907 flat jockeys' championship, and picked up his only British Classic: the 1907 2,000 Guineas on Slieve Gallion.  He was a short-priced favourite to follow up in the Derby, but the colt did not stay the distance and eventually finished third. In 1907, he finished with 146 winners from 732 rides, a near 20% strike rate.

In 1911 he scored a succession of top-class victories on Darling's stayer, Willonyx, winning the Chester Cup, Ascot Gold Cup, Jockey Club Cup and Cesarewitch. He also won the 1913 Doncaster Cup on Long Set.

Higgs later became a trainer and developed Blacklands Stud near Calne in Wiltshire, on a farm which he had bought in 1909; in 1928 he sold the business to Fred Darling, Sam's son.

In 1999, he was ranked the 28th greatest flat jockey of the 20th century by the Racing Post.

Major wins
 Great Britain

Classic Races
 2,000 Guineas – Slieve Gallion (1907)

Selected other races
Ascot Gold Cup – Willonyx (1911)
Cambridgeshire Handicap  – Land League (1907)
Cesarewitch Handicap – Willonyx (1911)
Chester Cup – Willonyx (1911)
Doncaster Cup – Long Set (1913)
Hardwicke Stakes –  Beppo (1907)
Jockey Club Cup – Willonyx (1911)
Jockey Club Stakes – Beppo (1906)

References

English jockeys
British Champion flat jockeys
1880 births
1958 deaths